Abu Ahmed Faysal (born 11 June 1974) is a Bangladeshi football coach and former national team player, he last managed Bashundhara Kings Women.

References

External links
 
 

Living people
Footballers from Dhaka
People from Dhaka District
Bangladeshi football managers
1974 births
Bangladeshi footballers
Bangladesh international footballers
Association football defenders
Arambagh KS players
Brothers Union players
Farashganj SC players